Eleven Years and One Day is a 1963 West German drama film directed by Gottfried Reinhardt and starring Ruth Leuwerik, Bernhard Wicki and Paul Hubschmid.

It was shot at the Bavaria Studios in Munich and on location in Salzburg.

Cast
 Ruth Leuwerik as Tina Rodenbach
 Bernhard Wicki as Karl Rodenbach
 Paul Hubschmid as Tony Cameron
 Margot Trooger as Fanni Gruber
 Wolfgang Dörich as Pichler
 Heinrich Schweiger as Stumpf
 Georg Corten as Wotawa
 Karl Tischlinger

See also
 Separate Lies (2005), also based on Nigel Balchin's 1951 novel A Way Through the Wood

References

Bibliography 
 Bergfelder, Tim. International Adventures: German Popular Cinema and European Co-Productions in the 1960s. Berhahn Books, 2005.

External links 
 

1963 films
1963 drama films
German drama films
West German films
1960s German-language films
Films directed by Gottfried Reinhardt
Adultery in films
Films based on British novels
Films shot at Bavaria Studios
1960s German films